Chuandong Subdistrict is an urban subdistrict in Puding County, Guizhou, China.

History
According to the result on adjustment of township-level administrative divisions of Puding County on January 29, 2016, Chengguan Town and Longchang Township were revoked. Chuandong Subdistrict was established.

Administrative division
As of January 2016, the subdistrict is divided into 18 villages and 3 communities: Xi'an Community, Chuandong Community, Wenming Community, Sanhe Village, Jinma New Village, Longma Village, Renmin Village, Hongxin Village, Changtian Village, Yanshang Village, Boyu Village, Xinhe Village, Xiushui Village, Lianhe Village, Mingxing Village, Jinghu Village, Dashu Village, Gongda Village, Longxin Village, Xiaoyao Village, and Dianshan Village.

Hospital
The Puding County People's Hospital is located in the subdistrict.

Transportation
The County Road X436 passes across the subdistrict.

References

Divisions of Puding County
Subdistricts of Guizhou